Harold Raymond Parks (born May 22, 1949) is an American mathematician and is a professor emeritus of mathematics at Oregon State University.

Parks obtained his Ph.D. in 1974 from Princeton University, under the supervision of Frederick J. Almgren, Jr. In 2012, he became a fellow of the American Mathematical Society.

He has developed and implemented a computational technique for computing parametric area minimizing surfaces. He derived an existence and regularity theory for a class of constrained variational problems. Parks has discovered, and characterized, a type of minimal surface with surprising properties, defined in terms of the Jacobi elliptic functions.

References 

1949 births
Living people
20th-century American mathematicians
21st-century American mathematicians
Fellows of the American Mathematical Society
Princeton University alumni
Oregon State University faculty